Mathes may refer to:

Ben Mathes, minister in the Presbyterian Church (USA) involved in providing health care in remote regions of the world
Charles Mathes (born 1949), American author of mystery novels
Cheff v. Mathes (Del. 1964), case in the Delaware Supreme Court
Curtis Mathes Corporation, North American electronics retailer based in Garland, Texas
Elser-Mathes Cup, celebrates the first two-way contact by amateur radio between the Earth and Mars
Harry Mathes (1882–1969), American painter in the New York art scene
Les Mathes, commune in the Charente-Maritime department in western France
Mathes Roriczer (1440–1493), German architect
Merissa Mathes (born 1940), American actress and model
Rob Mathes, American record producer, music arranger, composer, songwriter, and performer
Simone Mathes (born 1975), German hammer thrower
W. Michael Mathes (1936–2012), American historian and academic